The Midnight Story is a 1957 American CinemaScope film noir crime film directed by Joseph Pevney and starring Tony Curtis, Marisa Pavan and Gilbert Roland. The film was originally slated to be titled The Eyes of Father Tomasino, after the 1955 Lux Video Theatre TV episode it was based on.

Plot
Father Tomasino is stabbed to death. San Francisco traffic cop Joe Martini felt the priest was like an actual father to him. He asks to assist homicide Lieutenant Kilrain in his investigation, but after being rejected, Joe quits the force.

He has a hunch restaurant owner Sylvio Malatesta could be involved. Joe is warmly welcomed by Sylvio's family, however, and falls in love with a cousin, Anna. He hides his past identity as a cop from her.

Something is troubling Sylvio, but the family believes he still misses a sweetheart killed in Italy during the war. Sylvio also has an alibi for the night of the priest's murder, but Sergeant Gillen gets word to Joe that the alibi is a fake.

In a ploy to encourage Sylvio to confide in him, Joe pretends to be a murder suspect himself. Sylvio breaks down and admits to having killed his own sweetheart, then the priest as well after confiding to him about the murder in confession. Sylvio runs into the street and is struck by a moving vehicle. Dying, he begs for Joe's forgiveness.

Cast
 Tony Curtis as Joe Martini
 Marisa Pavan as Anna Malatesta
 Gilbert Roland as Sylvio Malatesta
 Jay C. Flippen as Sergeant Jack Gillen
 Argentina Brunetti as Mama Malatesta
 Ted de Corsia as Lieutenant Kilrain
 Richard Monda as "Peanuts" Malatesta
 Kathleen Freeman as Rosa Cuneo
 Herb Vigran as Charlie Cuneo (as Herburt Vigran)
 Peggy Maley as Veda Pinelli
 John Cliff as Father Giuseppe
 Russ Conway as Det. Sgt. Sommers
 Chico Vejar as Frankie Pellatrini
 Tito Vuolo as Grocer
 Helen Wallace as Mother Catherine 
 James Hyland as Frank Wilkins

Production 
The film was shot on location in San Francisco in August 1956. At Tony Curtis's request, the shoot following a "French" shooting schedule, whereby filming would begin at noon and run continuously until 7 p.m.

See also
 List of American films of 1957

External links

References 

1957 films
Film noir
Films directed by Joseph Pevney
1957 crime films
Universal Pictures films
CinemaScope films
Films set in San Francisco
American crime films
1950s English-language films
1950s American films